Shankar Krishnamurthy (aka Krishnamoorthy) is an anchor who has hosted shows inTamil and Kannada. He is also an engineer, a management consultant, and a lawyer.

Early life 
Shankar Krishnamurthy was born in Nangavaram, Trichy district Tamilnadu and was fully brought up and educated in Chennai. He is a mechanical engineering graduate and has done his Master of Business Administration (Specialisation in Marketing) and LLB (Basic Laws) and armed with a Master of Business Laws from the National Law School of India University, Bangalore. He worked in corporate consulting and training for more than two decades before entering the film and media industry. He is a trainer and consultant in various areas, including personality development, industrial safety, environmental issues, soft skills, fire safety, and Lean Six Sigma.

Career 
He got into media through radio (FM) first in Bangalore as an anchor and anchored shows in Doordarshan (Chandana- Kannada) and DD-Podhigai (Tamil). He has done many shows with celebrities and professionals in the fields of education, literature, arts, entertainment, and medicine.

Personal life 
Shankar Krishnamurthy does legal consulting and works as a script and legal advisor. He has written articles in English and Tamil in various newspapers and magazines. He has been interviewed and appeared in leading newspapers and television channels.

References 

Living people
People from Karur district
Indian radio presenters
Indian management consultants
Year of birth missing (living people)